Henrik Holm and Anders Järryd were the defending champions, but competed this year with different partners.

Holm teamed up with Sébastien Lareau and lost in the second round to Jakob Hlasek and David Prinosil.

Järryd teamed up with John Fitzgerald and lost in the final 6–3, 3–6, 7–6 to Mark Knowles and Jonathan Stark.

Seeds
The top four seeds received a bye into the second round.

Draw

Finals

Top half

Bottom half

References

External links
 Official results archive (ATP)
 Official results archive (ITF)

1995 Japan Open Tennis Championships